Let's Be Lovers Again is a duet performed by American rock singer Eddie Money and singer-songwriter Valerie Carter. The song appeared on Money's album Playing for Keeps in 1980. It was released as a single and reached #65 on the Billboard Hot 100.

References 

Eddie Money songs
1980 singles
1980 songs
Columbia Records singles
Songs written by Eddie Money